Clonmore is a hamlet and townland in County Armagh, Northern Ireland. It is close to the banks of the River Blackwater.

Clonmore shrine
The Clonmore shrine was found on the banks of the Blackwater river which runs along the big meadow, and is Ireland's earliest Christian metal artifact. It is housed in the Ulster Museum in Belfast.

Sport
The local Gaelic football club is Clonmore Robert Emmet's GFC, which competes in Co. Tyrone competitions at Junior level. Underage boys' football is organised through an amalgamation with neighbors Collegeland and Annaghmore. The teams play as Naomh Eoin. Girls and Ladies football is offered through the sister club Naomh Labhaoise.

Former railway
The Great Northern Railway Board closed the station in 1954 and the Ulster Transport Authority closed the railway in 1965.

References

External links
Clonmore community website

Villages in County Tyrone
Townlands of County Tyrone